"" is a humorous term describing the supposed cultural boundary separating Southern Germany from the northern parts, especially Bavaria from Central Germany.

It is named for the Weisswurst sausage of Bavaria, and has no precise definition. A popular one is the linguistic boundary known as the Speyer line separating Upper German from Central German dialects, roughly following the Main River; another is a line running further south, more or less along the Danube, or between the Main and the Danube, roughly along the 49th parallel north circle of latitude.

See also
 
 Barassi Line

References 

 Duden Deutsches Universalwörterbuch, 6th edition,

External links

 definition on Indigo Magazine, p.57
 Interview with Oktoberfest innkeeper Wiggerl Hagn at Deutschlandradio Kultur 

Cultural boundaries
German cuisine
German culture